Progress M-10M, identified by NASA as Progress 42P, is a Progress spacecraft which was launched on 27 April 2011 to resupply the International Space Station. It was the tenth Progress-M 11F615A60 spacecraft to be launched, and has the serial number 410. The spacecraft was manufactured by RKK Energia, and is operated by the Russian Federal Space Agency. On 29 April 2011, it arrived at the space station's Pirs Docking Compartment during Expedition 27.

Launch
Progress M-10M lifted off from launch pad number 1 of the Baikonur cosmodrome at 13:05 UTC on 27 April 2011. Progress M-10M achieved the preliminary planned orbit after nine minutes of the launch. Onboard commands were issued to unfurl the spacecraft's communications and navigation antennas and extend two power-generating solar arrays. A series of engine firings over the next two days guided the spacecraft toward a linkup with the International Space Station (ISS).

Docking
Progress M-10M autonomously flew for two days after the launch and arrived at the ISS on 29 April 2011, successfully docking to the nadir port of the Pirs at 14:19 UTC. The docking occurred as the two spacecraft were traveling 354 kilometres over western Mongolia. The linkup happened just over five hours before NASA's first launch attempt of the Space Shuttle Endeavour on STS-134 mission. The shuttle launch was scrubbed because two heaters on one of Endeavour's auxiliary power units failed.

Cargo

Inventory 

Total cargo mass delivered: 2645 kg

Undocking and decay

Progress M-10M undocked nominally at 09:04 UTC on 29 October 2011 from the nadir port of the Pirs Docking Compartment after hooks open command at 09:01 UTC. An automated 15 seconds separation burn followed at 09:07 UTC. The cargo ship, loaded with trash, performed its 3-minute deorbit burn at 12:10:30 UTC. It entered the Earth's atmosphere at 12:48 UTC and burned up at 12:54 UTC. Surviving debris impacted in the Pacific Ocean at around 13:00 UTC.

With the Progress M-10M undocking, the Space Station was in a very rare configuration of having only one Russian vehicle docked (Soyuz TMA-02M at Rassvet Module). The last time this situation occurred was in March 2009.

References

External links

 Progress M-10M (42P) ISS resupply craft

Spacecraft launched in 2011
Progress (spacecraft) missions
Spacecraft which reentered in 2011
Articles containing video clips
Spacecraft launched by Soyuz-U rockets
Supply vehicles for the International Space Station